Bystřice is a river in the Czech Republic, draining south from its source near Pecka through Miletín, Hořice, Mokrovousy, Nechanice, Boharyně, Kratonohy and merging with Cidlina at Chlumec nad Cidlinou. It is 62.7 km long, and its basin area is 379 km2.

A survey conducted in 2010 showed that the Bystřice River was inhabited by a total of 21 species of aquatic molluscs, out of which 11 were gastropods and the remaining 10 were bivalves. Most of the recorded species were common ones. Although previous researches had shown the river to have an even higher number of species, the most notable find of the research in 2010 was the increase in the alien Potamopyrgus antipodarum and Physella acuta species. On the other hand, there was also the delightful discovery of the presence of the endangered bivalve Unio crassus, with an increased population density of the species as compared to a few years ago.

References

External links 
  Beran L. (2011). "Příspěvek k poznání vodních měkkýšů evropsky významné lokality Bystřice se zaměřením na populaci velevruba tupého (Unio crassus). [A contribution to the knowledge of aquatic molluscs of the Bystřice SCI focused on the population of Unio crassus]." Malacologica Bohemoslovaca 10: 10–17. PDF.

Rivers of the Hradec Králové Region